Charles Harper may refer to:

Charles Harper (colonial administrator) (1876–1950), English rugby player, civil servant and Governor of St. Helena
Charles Harper (mayor) (c. 1875–1954), Western Australian businessman and mayor of two local governments
Charles Harper (minister) (1799–1872), Anglican minister in Toodyay Western Australia
Charles Harper (politician) (1842–1912), pastoralist, newspaper proprietor and politician in colonial Western Australia
Charles A. Harper (born c. 1815), Justice of the Arkansas Supreme Court
Charles George Harper (1863–1943), English author and illustrator

C. Michael Harper (1927–2016), American businessman
Jack Harper (1900s pitcher) (Charles William Harper, 1878–1950), pitcher in Major League Baseball
Chick Harper (Charles Harper), American baseball player

Other uses 
Charlie Harper (Two and a Half Men)

See also
Charlie Harper (disambiguation)